Saint-Malon-sur-Mel (Gallo: Saent-Méha) is a commune in the Ille-et-Vilaine department of Brittany in northwestern France.

Population
Inhabitants of Saint-Malon-sur-Mel are called malonnais in French.

See also
Communes of the Ille-et-Vilaine department

References

External links

Mayors of Ille-et-Vilaine Association 

Communes of Ille-et-Vilaine